Jeppe Illum (born 25 March 1992) is a Danish footballer who plays for Danish 2nd Division club Holbæk B&I.

Career
Illum joined Vendsyssel in the summer 2017. On 31 January 2019, he was loaned out to Næstved BK in the Danish 1st Division. However, he did not become eligible to play for the club because they didn't got his license registered in time. Therefore, he moved to FC Roskilde on 7 April 2019, also on loan for the rest of the season.

He was signed by Arendal Fotball in the autumn of 2019, but was not retained after the 2019 season. In 2020, he began training with Danish 2nd Division club Holbæk B&I while waiting for an offer from a Norwegian club. However, the offer never came, and he ended up signing a short deal with Holbæk on 18 June 2020 for the rest of the season.

References

External links
 
 Danish national team profile

1992 births
Living people
Danish men's footballers
Danish Superliga players
Danish 1st Division players
Silkeborg IF players
Næstved Boldklub players
Vendsyssel FF players
FC Roskilde players
Arendal Fotball players
Norwegian Second Division players
Danish expatriate men's footballers
Expatriate footballers in Norway
Danish expatriate sportspeople in Norway
Association football forwards
Denmark youth international footballers
Denmark under-21 international footballers
Holbæk B&I players